Zeppelin LZ 104 (construction number, designated L 59  by the German Imperial Navy) and nicknamed Das Afrika-Schiff ("The Africa Ship"), was a World War I German dirigible. It is famous for having attempted a long-distance resupply mission to the beleaguered garrison of Germany's East Africa colony.

History

Africa flight 

The L 59 was a naval airship ordered to prepare for the resupply of Generalmajor Paul von Lettow-Vorbeck’s troops.

On 4 November 1917, after a 29-hour flight from Friedrichshafen under the command of Hugo Eckener, the airship arrived at Yambol in Bulgaria, the last available airbase before flying over two thousand miles across the Mediterranean and Entente-held Africa. At Jambol Kapitänleutnant [Lieutenant Commander] Ludwig Bockholt, a regular German naval officer, met the zeppelin.  He would be commander for the mission, code named China-Sache, loosely translated as "China Show" or "China Matter."

It would be impossible to resupply the airship with hydrogen gas upon its arrival in Africa, and it was decided that no return trip would be made. Instead, it was planned that every part of the ship be cannibalized for use by Lettow-Vorbeck's bush army.  The outer envelope would be used for tents, muslin linings would become bandages, the duralumin framework would be used for wireless towers, and so on.  In addition to its own structure, L 59 carried  of supplies. The cargo included machine guns plus spares and ammunition, food, medical supplies, a medical team and Iron Cross medals.

L 59's two initial attempts at starting the journey were foiled by weather in the Mediterranean. Its third departure on 21 November 1917 was successful. The ship made good time over Adrianople, the Sea of Marmara and the coast of Asia Minor. Due to electrical storms over Crete, its wireless aerial was wound in and so the airship failed to receive messages from the German admiralty. It crossed the African coast at 05:15 on 22 November 1917 near Mersa Matruh and, flying via the Dakhla Oasis, set a dog-leg course up the Nile. That afternoon, an engine malfunctioned when a reduction gear housing cracked; the loss of this engine eliminated the prospect of radio transmission, although wireless messages could be received. The next morning it nearly crashed when heat turbulence from the dunes below and subsequent cooling reduced the buoyancy of its gas. The crew also suffered from headaches, hallucinations and general fatigue in the mid-day heat and freezing cold at night.

Despite these difficulties, L 59 continued on over Sudan, only to be turned back on 23 November 1917, with the ship  due west of Khartoum when she received an "abort" message. L 59's volunteer crew implored the commander to continue, but he ordered the ship to turn back and returned to Bulgaria after averting another potential disaster due to loss of buoyancy over Asia Minor. When it entered its shed at Jambol, the Zeppelin had enough fuel remaining for another 64 hours flight.

It was later claimed by Richard Meinertzhagen, the chief of British intelligence in the area based at Cairo, that the recall message reporting that Lettow-Vorbeck had surrendered was faked. The British, having broken the German naval wireless code, were aware of the flight and mission. East Africa's Royal Flying Corps (RFC) squadrons were alerted to watch for the approach of the ship.  What turned the airship back was a signal relayed from Lettow-Vorbeck.  The weak signal was amplified and forwarded by stations in friendly or neutral territories, and after some hours it reached the German naval command. The signal informed headquarters not that Lettow had surrendered, but that the Schutztruppe had been unable to hold the flatlands around Mahenge, the planned destination of the airship, and had been forced by British artillery to retreat into jagged mountains where the airship would have no chance of touching down without risking explosion. With no hope of a place to land safely and with every likelihood of it being destroyed or falling into enemy hands, the German command had no choice but to order a return. The recall signal was sent from the Admiralty station at Nauen.  Despite its failure, "the adventure of L 59 was heroic both in scale and spirit." Later a transcript of the radio message was reported to have been found in Germany archives, as well as a Turko-German wireless intercept (marked 'Secret') preserved in the files of the British Public Records office.

Final fate
Since the airship was not expected to return from her African mission, no plans for any further missions had been made. Another African flight was out of the question, so the ship was then offered for flights to supply the Ottoman army of Enver Pasha in Arabia, or to search for mines off Constantinople, but nothing came of these proposals. After several reconnaissance flights and bombing missions, L 59 took off from Jambol to attack the British naval base at Malta, proceeding across the Balkans to the Strait of Otranto.  On the evening of 7 April 1918 the surfaced German submarine UB-53 observed the airship approaching from astern.  Her commanding officer, Oberleutnant zur See Robert Sprenger, reported that he watched her fly past at about 210 m (700 ft), so "close in fact that the details of the gondola could be seen clearly." A few minutes later, Sprenger noted two bursts in the air, and shortly afterwards "a gigantic flame enveloped the airship and it nosed down into the water."  The airship's destruction was not claimed by either the British or the Italians; her loss was officially attributed to an accident. None of the 21 crew survived the crash.

Record
Over a century after its flight,  in 95 hours is still the longest non-stop military airship flight in history.

In popular culture
The airship and its long-distance resupply mission was featured in The Ghosts of Africa, a 1980 historical novel by British-born Canadian novelist William Stevenson set during the East African Campaign. Polish pilot and novelist Janusz Meissner described this flight in his novel L59. The protagonist of O Olho de Hertzog, a 2010 novel by João Paulo Borges Coelho set in post–World War I Mozambique, arrives in Africa by jumping from the airship using a parachute. The Wilbur Smith novel Assegai has plot elements inspired by the airship's journey.  L 59 is a centerpiece of the alternate history novel The Romanov Rescue by Tom Kratman, Justin Watson, and Kacey Ezell.

Specifications

References

Citations

General references 
 Miller, Charles. Battle for the Bundu: The First World War in East Africa. New York: MacMillan Publishing Co. 1974.  .
 Robinson, Douglas H. Giants in the Sky. Henley-on-Thames: Foulis, 1973. .
 Robinson, Douglas H. The Zeppelin in Combat (3rd ed.). Henley-on-Thames: Foulis, 1971. .
  - Total pages: 353
   
  - Total pages: 353
  - Total pages: 290
  - Total pages: 319

External links

Zeppelins
1910s German military transport aircraft
1910s German bomber aircraft
Hydrogen airships
Airships of the Imperial German Navy
1917 in Bulgaria
Yambol
Aircraft first flown in 1917